Christavia may refer to either one of two aircraft designs by Ron Mason, Elmwood Aviation, Belleville, Ontario, Canada:
Christavia Mk I
Christavia Mk IV